Esko Uolevi Valkama (21 December 1924 – 28 December 2007) is a Finnish former footballer who competed in the 1952 Summer Olympics. He was born in Kiikoinen.

References

1924 births
2007 deaths
Finnish footballers
Olympic footballers of Finland
Footballers at the 1952 Summer Olympics
Association football midfielders
Finland international footballers
Sportspeople from Satakunta